Sam Sumyk (born 1967) is a French tennis coach. He has coached Donna Vekic since September 2020. Until late March 2020, he coached WTA tennis pro Anastasia Pavlyuchenkova, but the two parted ways after just over six months. He has previously worked with former world number one players Victoria Azarenka and Garbiñe Muguruza, former world number two Vera Zvonareva, 2014 Wimbledon finalist Eugenie Bouchard, as well as other players.

Personal life
Sumyk is married to former WTA player Meilen Tu, whom he coached to her highest career ranking of 35 in 2007.

Coaching career
Prior to 2010, Sumyk coached Russian Vera Zvonareva, who first entered the top ten briefly in 2004 before injuries threatened to derail her career. After the pair split in 2009, Sumyk switched with António van Grichen and became the coach of Victoria Azarenka.

The partnership between Sumyk and Azarenka would be a successful one. In his third year coaching Azarenka, the Belarusian won her first Grand Slam title at the 2012 Australian Open and reigned as the world number one for 51 of the 55 weeks that followed, during which she also successfully defended her Australian Open title in 2013. Sumyk split from Azarenka shortly after the 2015 Australian Open, after the Belarusian endured an injury-plagued 2014.

Sumyk then coached former world number five Eugenie Bouchard from February until August 2015. He then coached Garbiñe Muguruza; under his stewardship, Muguruza would win her first Grand Slam singles title at the 2016 French Open and her second at the 2017 Wimbledon Championships. Sumyk was not present in that tournament due to be with his wife Meilen Tu, who was pregnant at the time. Former world number two Conchita Martínez took his place.

Sumyk would continue to coach Muguruza until the pair split at the 2019 Wimbledon Championships. After that he started coaching Anastasia Pavlyuchenkova. According to an interview Pavlyuchenkova did with the Russian website Kommersant, she attributed a recent hip injury in part to a new training regimen and tournament scheduling put into place with Sumyk's arrival. She also discusses how so many coaches have large egos, and how she realized at the Australian Open that the atmosphere was not conducive to making improvements on court.

References

French tennis coaches
Victoria Azarenka
1960s births
Living people